Baron Ferenc Forgách de Ghymes et Gács (c. 1530 – 19 January 1577) was a Hungarian prelate of the Roman Catholic Church, who served as bishop of Várad (today: Oradea Mare) and Chancellor of Transylvania between 1571 and 1575. His mentor was Nicolaus Olahus.

His nephews were, among others, Palatine Zsigmond Forgách and Archbishop of Esztergom Ferenc Forgách.

References

Bibliography
Markó, László: A magyar állam főméltóságai Szent Istvántól napjainkig - Életrajzi Lexikon p. 225.  (The High Officers of the Hungarian State from Saint Stephen to the Present Days - A Biographical Encyclopedia) (2nd edition); Helikon Kiadó Kft., 2006, Budapest; .
Szabó de Bártfa, László: A Hunt-Pázmán nemzetségbeli Forgách család története History of the Forgách family from the kindred of Hont-Pázmány; 1910, Esztergom.

1530 births
1577 deaths
Bishops of Várad
Ferenc, Forgach
Chancellors of Transylvania